1880 Women's Lawn Tennis season  was mainly composed of national, regional, county, local regular amateur tournaments. This year twelve tennis events for women were staged three of the them in Ireland and nine events in England between May and October 1880

History
The women's amateur tennis seasons covers a period of thirty five years from 1876 to 1912. During this period there was no single international organization responsible for overseeing tennis. At the very start in tennis history lawn tennis clubs themselves organized events and some like the All England Lawn Tennis and Croquet Club in England (f.1877) and the Fitzwilliam Lawn Tennis Club, Ireland (f.1879) generally oversaw tennis in their respective countries.

This would later change when tennis players started (those that could) traveled the world to compete in events organized by individual national lawn tennis associations  (NLTA)'s the oldest of which then was the United States Lawn Tennis Association (f. 1881). In certain countries that did not establish a national association until later, had provincial, regional or state lawn tennis associations overseeing tournaments in a province, region or state within a country, such as the Northern Lawn Tennis Association in Manchester, England (f.1880), had responsibility for coordinating tournaments staged by clubs in the North of England region. In Australia the Victorian Lawn Tennis Association (f.1904) organised tournaments in the state of Victoria, Australia.

In 1880 twelve tournaments for women were staged four of them in Ireland, and nine of them in England. In the spring in May the second Irish Championships are held this was the first major national championships in the world to feature not only a women's singles event won by a D. Meldon, but also a ladies doubles event, and a mixed doubles event. In August the Armagh Tennis Tournament is staged at the Archery Lawn Tennis Club, Armagh that features a mixed doubles event. In India at the close of May the Calcutta Cricket Club (f.1792), inaugurated an open lawn tennis tournament that featured 21 entries.

In June two tournaments are held featuring women's events. At the Devon and Cornwall Archery Society Tournament held at Manadon , Plymouth, Devon, England a mixed doubles event is won by Miss Keate and Mr.  A. Radcliffe. From June 14 to 22 the Kemptown Tournament was staged at Kemptown, Brighton, East Sussex, England that featured a ladies doubles event, that was won by two sister Miss Adshead and Miss. Eva Adshead, this event was notable in that this match was played over five sets. On 16 August the fourth annual Waterford Lawn Tennis Tournament was begun. On July 1 the Mersey Bowmen Archery Club Tournament began at Sefton Park, Aigburth in Liverpool, England, however it was not concluded until August 19. On August 16 the Devonshire Park Lawn Tennis Club began the Devonshire Park Championships at Eastbourne, England. Between 16 and 17 August the Mount's Bay Archery and Lawn tennis Clubs staged a two-day Mount's Bay Lawn Tennis Tournament at Mount's Bay. Penzance, Cornwall, England, the ladies singles being won by Miss. Jackson and the gentleman's singles by Mr. H. H. Ley of Truro.

In September 1880 the fifth edition of South of Ireland Championships in Limerick the singles event was won by Annie Rice. The same month the Ealing Cricket Club staged its first Ealing Cricket Club Lawn Tennis Tournament, that was to feature a mixed pairs event won by Blanche Bingley. On 16 September the second Saint Leonards-on-Sea Tournament began at the Archery Gardens, St Leonards-on-Sea, Hastings, East Sussex, England that ended on 18 September. On 24 September the Truro LTC Tournament commenced at Truro, in Cornawall, England. On 1 October 1880 the  Sussex County Lawn Tennis Tournament that began on 26 September concluded. At this time 'open' tournaments usually meant men's and women's players can compete.

At the 1880 Wimbledon Championships the world's first major tennis tournament, it still remained an all men's event, no women's events were staged. By 1881 for women there was a tennis circuit of sorts starting to form.

In 1913 the International Lawn Tennis Federation was created, that consisted of national member associations. The ILTF through its associated members then became responsible for supervising women's tour events.

Calendar
Notes 1: Challenge Round: the final round of a tournament, in which the winner of a single-elimination phase faces the previous year's champion, who plays only that one match. The challenge round was used in the early history of tennis (from 1877 through 1921), in some tournaments not all.* Indicates doubles ** mixed doubles
Notes 2:Tournaments in italics were events that were staged only once that season

Key

January to April
No events

May

June

July
No events

August

September

October

November to December 
No events

Tournament Winners
Singles and Mixed Doubles event winners below.

Singles
Important tournament in bold
  D. Meldon–Irish Championships–(1)
  Miss Ellen Maltby–Brighton–(1)
  Miss Smith–Limerick–(1)
  Miss Jackson–Penzance–(1)
  Miss Augusta Langley–St Leonards-on-Sea–(1)

Doubles
  Connie Butler/   May Langrishe–Irish Championships–(1)
  Miss Adshead/ Miss. Eva Adshead–Kemptown, Brighton–(1)

Mix Doubles
  Miss. Spreckley/ Dale Womersley–Eastbourne–(1)
  Blanche Bingley/ F.W. Rawson–Ealing–(1)
  Miss Costello/ Spencer D. Maul–Irish Championships–(1)
  Miss. Scott/ Mr. H.F. Rooke–Liverpool–(1)
  Miss Keate/ A. Radcliffe–Plymouth–(1)
  Mrs. Casey/ Mr. Casey–St Leonards-on-Sea–(1)

Tournaments
 Devon and Cornwall Archery Society Tournament
 Devonshire Park Championships
 Ealing Cricket Club Lawn Tennis Tournament
 Kemptown Tournament
 Mersey Bowmen Archery Club Tournament
 Mount's Bay Lawn Tennis Tournament
 Irish Championships
 South of Ireland Championships
 Saint Leonards-on-Sea Tournament
 Sussex County Lawn Tennis Tournament
 Truro LTC Tournament
 Waterford Tournament

References

Pre Open era tennis seasons
1880 Women's Tennis Tour